Yaakov Chesed is an American Jewish rock band from Long Island, New York. Formed in 2006, the group won Battle of the Bands competitions at Yeshiva University and Lander College before recording two studio albums, Rise Above (2007) and The Passage (2009). Their name is a quote from the Uva Letzion prayer in Shacharis.

Band history

Origins and initial run (2006–2010) 
Yaakov Chesed formed in the summer of 2006 with lead singer Jake Polansky, guitarist Michael Shapiro, bassist Dovi Salamon, and drummer Michael Moskowitz. They would often meet at Polansky's house for rehearsals on Motza'ei Shabbat. After Salamon left to attend Yeshivat Sha'alvim in Israel, Aryeh Kunstler was chosen to replace him as bassist.

In March 2007, the band co-headlined a Purim concert at the Knitting Factory with the band Heedoosh. That same year, they won Lander College and Yeshiva University's Battle of the Bands contests and gave an NCSY-sponsored Sukkot concert in Savannah, Georgia. Their debut album, Rise Above, was produced by Jake Antelis and released on December 11, 2007 by Sameach Music. The band performed at the 2008 Celebrate Israel Parade's Summer Stage in Central Park alongside the Piamenta Band, among others. Their second album, The Passage, co-produced by Kunstler and Antelis, was released by Sameach on November 30, 2009.

Revival and Reimagined (2019–present) 
In July 2019, after a long absence, Polansky announced via Instagram that he was reviving Yaakov Chesed as a solo project and working on a new album, using the hashtag #yaakovchesedisback. Later in the year he released two singles, "Crush Me" and "Ani L'dodi"; the former premiered with a music video filmed at 770 Eastern Parkway, the headquarters of Chabad. In 2020 he released another single, "Nothing But You (Ein Od)", a collaboration with his cousin Tani Polansky, who performs as Tefeelah. After several more singles in 2020 and 2021, Polansky reunited the other band members for the first time in over a decade for 2022's Reimagined EP, which saw them revisiting and rerecording several of their old songs.

Philanthropy
On May 16, 2010, the band was recruited to play at the bat mitzvah of Alix Klein at Temple Beth Shmuel in Miami Beach. Per Klein's request, the concert benefited ALYN Hospital in Jerusalem.

In 2013, Kunstler and Polansky, along with The Maccabeats' Immanuel Shalev and recording artist Simcha Leiner, were judges at V'Ata Banim Shiru, an annual a cappella competition at Torah Academy of Bergen County that benefits the Koby Mandell Foundation.

Other member projects
Bassist Aryeh Kunstler has released two albums as a solo artist and has contributed guitar, vocals, songwriting, and production to several artists. Another former bassist, Ben Wallick, has played for the Ruach Hakodesh wedding band and is the founder of Sonic Itch Productions.

Lead singer Jake Polansky debuted a folk rock solo project called ohr in late 2016. The project's debut EP, Side by Side, was mixed by Kunstler and mastered by Antelis and was released in 2017.

Band members

Current 
Jake Polansky – lead vocals, rhythm guitar

Former 
Michael Shapiro – lead guitar
Aryeh Kunstler – bass guitar, vocals
Michael Moskowitz – drums
Dovi Salamon – bass guitar
Ben Wallick – bass guitar

Touring 
Rami Glatt – keyboards

Discography

Albums
 Rise Above (2007; Sameach)
 The Passage (2009; Sameach)

EPs 

 Reimagined (2022)

Singles
 2007: "Shema Yisroel" (Rise Above)
 2009: "Eishet Chayil" (The Passage)
 2010: "Now I Know" (The Passage)
 2010: "Shema Yisroel" (a capella version)
 2019: "Crush Me"
 2019: "Ani L'dodi"
 2020: "Nothing But You (Ein Od)" (ft. Tani Polansky)
 2020: "Kol Yisrael"
 2020: "Open Up"
 2020: "Vayichulu"
 2021: "I Believe (Ani Maamin)" (ft. Shlomo Ashvil)
 2021: "Oseh Shalom"
 2022: "Shema (Reimagined)"
 2022: "Shalom (Reimagined)"
 2022: "Harmony (Reimagined)"
 2022: "Kol Yisrael" (a capella version)

References

External links

Jewish musical groups